Virág Nagy (born 4 July 2001) is a Hungarian professional footballer who plays as a defender for Italian Serie A club Sassuolo and the Hungary women's national team.

Career
Nagy is a member of the Hungary senior national team having been a regular at under 19 level. She made her debut for the team on 17 September 2020 against Sweden, coming on as a substitute for Zsanett Jakabfi.

References

2001 births
Living people
Women's association football defenders
Hungarian women's footballers
Hungary women's international footballers